Kenetswe Norah Mosenogi is a South African politician from the North West. A member of the African National Congress, she has been the Member of the Executive Council (MEC) for Arts, Culture and Recreation since November 2022 and a Member of the North West Provincial Legislature since May 2019. Previously, she had served as the MEC for Economic Development, Environment, Conservation and Tourism from May 2019 to November 2022. Mosenogi also served as the deputy secretary-general of the African National Congress Youth League from 2011 until 2013.

Education
Mosenogi obtained a master's degree in business administration from the North-West University Business School. She also holds a post-graduate diploma in monitoring and evaluation from the University of the Witwatersrand.

Career
Mosenogi served as both the director of scientific support services and the parliamentary liaison officer in the Department of Sport and Recreation. She also worked as an assistant student administrator at the University of South Africa.

Political career
Mosenogi was a senior member of the African National Congress Youth League. She was first elected to the league's national executive committee in 2008. She was also a councillor and the mayoral committee member for economic development of the Tlokwe Local Municipality, centred around Potchefstroom, until the May 2011 municipal elections. The following month, Mosenogi was elected deputy secretary-general of the ANC youth league. She succeeded Steven Nogbeni and served in the position until the league's leadership structure for that term was disbanded in March 2013. She was the only woman to serve in the league's national leadership for that term. Thandi Moraka was elected as her successor in September 2015.

Provincial government
Prior to the election on 8 May 2019, Mosenogi was placed 12th on the ANC's provincial list of candidates for the North West Provincial Legislature. She took office on 22 May 2019. A few days later, Mosenogi was appointed as the MEC for the newly established Economic Development, Environment, Conservation and Tourism portfolio in the executive council headed by Job Mokgoro. She assumed office on the same day.

On 22 November 2022, Mosenogi was appointed MEC for Arts, Culture and Recreation.

References

External links

Living people
Year of birth missing (living people)
21st-century South African politicians
African National Congress politicians
Members of the North West Provincial Legislature
University of the Witwatersrand alumni
North-West University alumni
Women members of provincial legislatures of South Africa